Mujahid Jamshed (born 1 December 1971, Muridke, Punjab) is a former Pakistani cricketer who played four ODIs in 1997. A right-handed middle-order batsman, he was called into the squad and made his debut during the 1996–97 ODI triangular tournament in Australia.

References 

1971 births
Living people
Pakistan One Day International cricketers
Habib Bank Limited cricketers
Pakistani cricketers
People from Muridke
Lahore Division cricketers
Lahore City cricketers
Pakistan Automobiles Corporation cricketers
Pakistan University Grants Commission cricketers
Islamabad cricketers
Sargodha cricketers
Gujranwala cricketers
Sheikhupura cricketers